Südliche Börde (Southern Börde) was a Verwaltungsgemeinschaft ("collective municipality") in the district of Schönebeck, in Saxony-Anhalt, Germany. It is situated south of Schönebeck. The seat of the Verwaltungsgemeinschaft was in Förderstedt. In May 2006, the remaining members of the Verwaltungsgemeinschaft merged with Förderstedt, and the Verwaltungsgemeinschaft was disbanded.

Former Verwaltungsgemeinschaften in Saxony-Anhalt